Bikás park is a station on Line 4 of the Budapest Metro. The station is located in the Kelenföld neighborhood in southern Buda. Its name is derived from the park (Bulls Park) in which the station entrance is located. The station was opened on 28 March 2014 as part of the inaugural section of the line, from Keleti pályaudvar to Kelenföld vasútállomás. 

It is among the first in the system to feature skylights. Gábor Dénes College is only a short walk away.

Connections
Bus: 7, 58, 114, 153, 213, 214
Tram: 1

References

M4 (Budapest Metro) stations
Railway stations opened in 2014
2014 establishments in Hungary